Stormfront Studios, Inc. was an American video game developer based in San Rafael, California. In 2007, the company had over 50 developers working on two teams, and owned all its proprietary engines, tools, and technology. As of the end of 2007, over fourteen million copies of Stormfront-developed games had been sold.  Stormfront closed on March 31, 2008, due to the closure of their publisher at the time, Sierra Entertainment.

The company received major awards and award nominations from The Academy of Interactive Arts & Sciences, G4 Television, BAFTA, The IGDA Game Developers Choice Awards, The EMMA Awards, SCEA, the Software Publishers Association and many magazines and websites.

In 2008, Neverwinter Nights was honored (along with EverQuest and World of Warcraft) at the 59th Annual Technology & Engineering Emmy Awards for advancing the art form of MMORPG  games. Don Daglow accepted the award for project partners Stormfront Studios, AOL and Wizards of the Coast.

History
Stormfront was founded in 1988 by Don Daglow, who had worked as a game programmer and then as Director of Game Development at Mattel Intellivision, as a producer at Electronic Arts, and as a production executive at Broderbund. Stormfront's management includes veterans of Disney, Electronic Arts, Ensemble Studios, LucasArts, Origin Systems, THX, Vivendi Universal and Warner Bros.

Stormfront was founded as Beyond Software, but changed its name in 1993 when the trademark for Beyond proved difficult to enforce.

Highlights 1988–1993
 Neverwinter Nights. Daglow had worked on game projects with Kathi McHugh and Steve Case of AOL (then called Quantum Computer Services) since early in AOL's history. Apart from baseball, Stormfront's initial projects were a series of online titles for AOL, including the first original play-by-email game, Quantum Space (1989) and later the first graphical MMORPG, the original Neverwinter Nights (1991–1997). Neverwinter Nights held the all-time record as the top revenue-producing online RPG for almost ten years until the success of Ultima Online in the late 1990s. BioWare subsequently purchased the rights to the name, and built a new generation of award-winning multiplayer RPGs set in the Neverwinter universe.
 Tony La Russa Baseball. Upon its founding in 1988 Stormfront's first project was a baseball title, which over the following eight years was to become the Tony La Russa Baseball series of games, working closely with baseball manager Tony La Russa. La Russa remains a member of the company's Board of Directors today. Daglow had previously designed or co-designed a number of baseball games, including Baseball, Intellivision World Series Baseball and Earl Weaver Baseball, the latter two with programmer Eddie Dombrower.
 Gold Box D&D Games. In 1990 the company began working with SSI on a series of Gold Box Dungeons and Dragons RPG games. This led to the company's first #1 hit, Gateway to the Savage Frontier (1991), and the first game where an AI character might fall in love with the player (depending on how they reacted to situations in the game), Treasures of the Savage Frontier (1992).
 Stronghold (1993).  The first RTS game to use a 3D perspective, Stronghold also featured a GUI interface in an era when most games continued to use text menus.

Highlights 1993–1999
 NASCAR Racing, the original versions of the top-selling American auto racing game series of all time, created by Stormfront for EA Sports. John Madden Football game designer Scott Orr, who produced a long series of games with Stormfront, championed the development of Andretti Racing, which led in turn to the creation of NASCAR.
 Madden NFL. Stormfront created the original PC versions of Madden for EA Sports.
 Byzantine: The Betrayal,  Although the game earned limited distribution in the United States, Stormfront's 1997 Discovery Channel game Byzantine: The Betrayal swept the European EMMA Awards at the Frankfurt Book Fair, winning honors as Best Adventure Game, Game of the Year, and CD of the Year.
 Tiger Woods PGA Tour Golf, EA Sports.
 Tony La Russa Baseball 3 and Old Time Baseball. In 1994-1995 the company self-published these two baseball games, both distributed by EA. The baseball strike of 1994 severely hampered sales, and Stormfront returned to being solely a developer.
 Stormfront was the first video game developer to use motion control photography in a video game, in the Electronic Arts game Eagle Eye Mysteries, (1993).

Highlights 2000–2005
 The Lord of the Rings: The Two Towers (2002). Published by Electronic Arts for PS2, GameCube. and Xbox and based on the Peter Jackson film from New Line Cinema. One of the top-selling games of both 2002 and 2003, The Two Towers allows players to join Frodo and the Fellowship of the Ring in their quest to save Middle-earth from Sauron. Players can fight as Aragorn, Legolas or Gimli in this epic adventure that features scenes and music from the first two movies in The Lord of the Rings film trilogy, battling Orcs including the Uruk-hai, Ringwraiths and more. Players play a pivotal role in the defense of Helm's Deep. The game features extensive unlockable content, including exclusive interviews with the stars of the films. Winner, Academy of Interactive Arts & Sciences Award for Outstanding Achievement in Visual Engineering.
 Blood Wake for Xbox (2001). A featured title in Microsoft’s launch of the Xbox, Blood Wake is a fast-action naval combat game with real wakes and waves and the most striking water effects created on a video game console. The game later became part of the Xbox Platinum line of classic hits.
 Demon Stone (2004). Published by Atari for PS2, Xbox and PC. Players can switch which of the three main characters they control “on the fly” at any moment to battle an onslaught of enemies. The game was nominated for multiple Academy of Interactive Arts & Sciences Interactive Achievement Awards and BAFTA Awards.

Highlights 2006–2008
 The Spiderwick Chronicles (2008) Wii, Xbox 360, PS2, and PC, published by Sierra, based on the Paramount film (adapted from the illustrated children's fantasy books written by Holly Black and illustrated by Tony DiTerlizzi).
 Eragon (2006).  Published by Vivendi Universal Games for Xbox 360, PS2, Xbox and PC, based on the Twentieth Century Fox movie Eragon, adapted from the best-selling Christopher Paolini fantasy novel.
 (2008) Stormfront closed on March 31, 2008.

Interactive television
Stormfront had an ongoing involvement in the development of games for Interactive television since its first experiments on Florida cable systems in 1990, and produced demos for companies including OpenTV.

Games developed

References

1up.com feature on Stormfront
GameBanshee feature on Stormfront
Game Informer article on Daglow
Underdogs company listing
MobyGames company summary

External links
Official Website
The Original Neverwinter Nights

Defunct video game companies of the United States
Video game companies established in 1988
Video game companies disestablished in 2008
Video game development companies
Companies based in San Rafael, California
Defunct companies based in the San Francisco Bay Area